Planipapillus taylori is a species of velvet worm in the Peripatopsidae family. This species has 15 pairs of legs in both sexes. It is found in New South Wales, Australia.

References

Further reading

Onychophorans of Australasia
Onychophoran species
Animals described in 1996